Shelley Gillen is a Canadian producer, screenwriter and songwriter.

Biography 
Shelley Gillen studied music at Interlochen Arts Academy, journalism at Ryerson University and drama at University of Toronto.

From 1994 to 2007, she was a senior pay-TV executive and helped other Canadian screenwriters, directors and producers bring their product to the screen. As Head of Creative Affairs for Movie Central, Corus Entertainment, she commissioned the network's first original drama series, serving as executive-in-charge-of production on ground-breakers such as ReGenesis (2004), Terminal City (2005), Durham County (2007) and Slings & Arrows (2003).

She played an integral role in the development and financing of more than a hundred feature films, including two Oscar nominees, Deepa Mehta's Water (2005) and Sarah Polley's Away from Her (2006), and was credited as an executive producer on Andrew Currie's Fido (2006).

In 2003, she was awarded with a Wayne Black Service Award from Women in Film and Television Vancouver and a Leo Awards for Outstanding Individual Achievement.

Filmography

Producer

Television 
 2010 : Paper Promises by Shane Harvey.
 2009 : Murdoch Mysteries by Cal Coons, Maureen Jennings and Alexandra Zarowny.
 2009 : The Listener by Michael Amo and Sam Egan.
 2009 : How to Boil a Frog by Jon Cooksey.

Cinema 
 2006 : Fido by Andrew Currie.
 1991 : Clearcut by Ryszard Bugajski.

Screenwriter 
 2018 : A Father's Nightmare by Vic Sarin.
 2014 : A Daughter's Nightmare by Vic Sarin.
 2013 : A Sister's Nightmare by Vic Sarin.
 2012 : A Mother's Nightmare by Vic Sarin.
 1997 : Kleo the Misfit Unicorn by Gordon Stanfield.

Songwriter 
 2014 : No Regrets (music by Shane Harvey), performed by Emily Osment in the movie A Daughter's Nightmare.
 2012 : Love Me Til You Die (music by Alexandra Mihill), performed by Jessica Lowndes in the movies A Mother's Nightmare and A Father's Nightmare.
 2010 : She Was My Momma and Till I'm Dead And Gone (music by Shane Harvey), performed by Larry Harvey in the documentary Paper Promises.
 1988 : Listen To The People (music by Shane Harvey), performed by Shane Harvey.
 1987 : Ricky (music by Shane Harvey), performed by Shane Harvey.

References

External links 
 

Year of birth missing (living people)
Living people
Canadian film producers
Canadian women film producers
Canadian women screenwriters
21st-century Canadian screenwriters
21st-century Canadian women writers
Canadian television producers
Canadian women television producers